Paris Saint-Germain Judo, commonly known as PSG Judo, is a French professional judo club based in the city of Paris in France. It is the judo department of Paris Saint-Germain. Having already existed between 1992 and 2003, the club was refounded in 2017. Their home ground is the CMG Dojo, located inside the CMG Sports Club One Italie complex. It houses the club's youth system, the Paris Saint-Germain Judo School, as well as high level training facilities for the club's professional judokas.

First established in September 1992 on the initiative of former judoka Thierry Rey and with the financial support of then Paris Saint-Germain owners Canal+, PSG Judo was the first section of the club to win a continental trophy. Led by star judokas David Douillet, Cécile Nowak, Djamel Bouras and Frédéric Demontfaucon, the Parisian team clinched the European Cup in 1995 and the French 1st Division Senior Championships in 1997. After that, however, the club experienced a steep decline, leading to Canal+'s disengagement in 2002 before finally cutting ties all together with PSG in 2003 and continuing life as Paris Judo under new owners Lagardère Group.

Driven by Djamel Bouras, who was part of the section's original iteration, PSG Judo was officially refounded on September 1, 2017. Paris Saint-Germain president Nasser Al-Khelaifi announced the news through a press release. He also confirmed the signing of French judoka star Teddy Riner as the figurehead of the project, while Djamel Bouras and Nicolas Mossion were appointed president and head coach, respectively. Initially a male-only project, PSG Judo ended up being a mixed-gender team.

Since their comeback, both PSG's male and female teams have enjoyed domestic and European success. The men's side, spearheaded by Teddy Riner, Alpha Oumar Djalo and Luca Otmane, won the French 2nd Division Senior Championships in 2019, the French 1st Division Senior Championships in 2021 and the Europa League in 2021. Likewise, Romane Dicko, Marie-Ève Gahié and Amandine Buchard carried the women's outfit to victory in the 2021 French 1st Division Senior Championships and the 2021 Europa League, allowing PSG Judo to become the first club to achieve the male-female double at both national and international level.

History

Creation and inaugural season

After basketball and handball, Paris Saint-Germain and owners Canal+ set their sights on judo. Alliance 77, a club based in Lagny, was chosen to become PSG's judo section and Canal+ acquired it in September 1992. Created a year earlier after bringing together several Parisian clubs, Alliance 77 was the brainchild of its president Thierry Rey, a former judoka and 1980 Olympic champion turned judo consultant on Canal+. Olympic gold medalist and world champion Cécile Nowak, Laurence Sionneau and Karine Petit joined the women's side, while French international judokas Nasser Néchar, Philippe Démarche and Bertrand Amoussou-Guenou were the big signings of the men's outfit.

The recruitment was promising and it allowed PSG to be at the forefront of French judo during their inaugural 1993 season, in the company of Orléans. In February 1993, Rey and PSG organized the 22nd edition of the Grand Slam Paris at the Stade Pierre de Coubertin, welcoming the elite of world judo and fielding nine of the club's judokas. The next step of the project was to sign a big name, and David Douillet, the greatest hope of French judo, was the obvious choice. Licensed to fellow Parisian club Maisons-Alfort, his arrival was formalized in October 1993. Douillet's impact was immediate, leading PSG to victory in a friendly tournament at Boulogne-Billancourt in November 1993.

Nowak's retirement and European Cup winners

The 1994 season began with a final challenge for Cécile Nowak. Aged 26, she decided to put an end to her career after the French team championships in Reims in January. The club's female side finished in third place, while the men's team were beaten by Orléans in the final. In March 1994, as part of president Thierry Rey's jubilee, PSG won the Capitals tournament ahead of German outfit Abensberg, confirming their continental ambitions. The male squad, despite the absence of star David Douillet in the first two rounds, had a good run in the European Cup. Douillet's return for the semifinals against Berlin in Lagny didn't bode well, though; he was defeated for the first time in two and a half years as PSG crashed out of the competition.

PSG opened the 1995 season with a new let-down at the French team championships in Tours in January. With both teams level in the final, the men's title slipped away from the capital club in the tie-breaking match as Nasser Néchar lost to Orléans' Laurent Calléja. The women suffered the same fate, falling to Levallois in the final. PSG turned their season around in November 1995, when the club's male team were crowned European champions in Germany. Following their success against hosts Abensberg in the semifinals, the Parisians defeated Ukrainian side Taifun Dnipro in the final and became the third French club to win the European Cup after Orléans and Racing. It was also PSG's first international title, all disciplines combined.

The club's hangover from their continental triumph led to a disappointing 1996 season. David Douillet, not up to speed just yet, witnessed from the stands the men's loss to Racing in the semifinals of the French team championships in Lyon in January. The women went one better but fell to Levallois in the final. Weakened by long-term injury absentee Douillet, involved in a serious motorcycle accident, current holders PSG then failed to defend their European crown, finishing fourth behind Orléans in the final four organized by the club at the Stade Pierre de Coubertin.

European Cup runner-ups, national champions and sanction for Bouras

The ambitious signings of Djamel Bouras and Frédéric Demontfaucon, coupled with the return of David Douillet to training in January, seemed to herald a promising 1997 season. Victory at the Schaenbeek International Tournament in April confirmed these expectations. In October, after PSG's win over Dnepropetrovsk, Bouras tested positive for nandrolone, thus being ruled out for the European Cup final and risking three years of suspension. Douillet also had to forfeit because of pain in his left shoulder. Destabilized by these events, and missing their two stars, PSG narrowly lost the final to German team Abensberg. Granted a suspended sentence of four months to prepare his defense, Bouras was finally part of PSG's winning team at the French 1st Division Senior Championships. Having completely dominated AC Boulogne-Billancourt in the final, the Parisians secured their first national title.

1998 saw a decline in fortune for the club, with an injury-riddled Douillet, Karine Petit's departure from a PSG women's side lacking in ambition, and the two-year suspension of Bouras in April by the doping commission of the French Judo Federation. Further, Jessy Euclid, one of the club's biggest young talents, passed away in a car accident in May at only 23 years old. A minute of silence was observed during PSG's victory against Romanian outfit Oradea in the European Cup. Some good news were a fourth-consecutive continental semifinal, despite the absence of Douillet due to a wrist injury, and the new-found facilities at L'Aquaboulevard de Paris, a dojo finally worthy of the club's standing. In November, following a successful appeal by Bouras, the Court of Arbitration for Sport allowed him to take part in the final four of the European Cup in Germany.

With Douillet still injured, Bouras and PSG managed to oust Abendsberg, German hosts and three-time European champions in the last four seasons, but yielded in the final to Dutch side Kenamju Haarlem in a unfavorable atmosphere, the German public booing Bouras. For the French 1st Division Senior Championships, Bouras was once again at the centre of controversy. The club heavily relied on him since new recruits Franck Bellard and Karim Boumedjane were unavailable and Douillet was out through injury, but Bouras refused to fight claiming angina as the team finished third. Angered, president Thierry Rey even threatened to exclude him from the club. Demontfaucon, newly-crowned national champion at the French individual championships, was now the great hope of a PSG in need of stars, after the failed season of Bouras and Douillet.

Rebirth of PSG Judo

On September 1, 2017, Paris Saint-Germain president Nasser Al-Khelaifi announced the relaunch of Paris Saint-Germain Judo, the club's judo department. The press release was accompanied by the presentation of French judoka Teddy Riner, who signed until 2022 to spearhead the project, and the appointment of Djamel Bouras as club president. Nicolas Mossion, for his part, was named sporting director, head coach and performance manager of PSG Judo. Julien Boussuge and Laurent Calléja were also signed as coaches.

Judo at the club is not entirely new. The section existed already between 1992 and 2003, and boasted the likes of Olympic champions David Douillet and Djamel Bouras as well as a young Teddy Riner, who rose through the ranks of the Parisians. This first iteration of PSG Judo shone on the domestic and continental tatami mats in the 1990s, with the men's team winning the European Cup in 1995 and the French 1st Division Senior Championships in 1997.

From male-only to mixed-gender project

At first, this new version of PSG Judo was supposed to be composed of a male-only team of judokas of all ages. Teddy Riner was the club's sole judoka during its first year. The other judokas contacted to join him in the new Parisian project were not convinced by the proposed contractual conditions: one-year fixed-term contracts, accompanied by unattractive salaries (less than 4,000 euros a month). Walide Khyar (European −60 kg champion), Benjamin Axus (French −73 kg champion) or Pape Ndiaye (French −81 kg champion) notably declined the proposal.

In consequence, PSG's initial male-only approach changed to a mixed-gender project. Ahead of their 2018–19 redebut season, they signed several judokas, including female junior European champion Faïza Mokdar, to compete alongside multiple men's world champion Teddy Riner. The club also opened the Paris Saint-Germain Judo School, and inaugurated its dojo, located in the CMG Sports Club One Italie complex at Porte d'Italie in the 13th arrondissement of Paris.

National and European doubles 

PSG further expanded its roster for the 2019–20 campaign, in which the club's male side celebrated the national title at the French 2nd Division Senior Championships. 2020–21 saw even more arrivals, most notably those of Marie-Ève Gahié, Romane Dicko, Alpha Oumar Djalo, Luca Otmane, and Amandine Buchard, as PSG qualified for the Europa League. The club also reinforced its coaching staff with Florent Urani.

Led by Teddy Riner, Romane Dicko, Amandine Buchard and Luca Otmane, PSG made their return to the European stage in 2021–22, claiming an unprecedented double at the Europa League in December 2021. The club's men and women won their respective Europa League finals and hence clinched a spot in next year's Champions League. Both teams repeated the feat on the national stage at the French 1st Division Senior Championships in May 2022. Teddy Riner guided the men's squad to victory, while Marie-Ève Gahié and Romane Dicko made sure PSG became the first team to achieve the male-female double at the French nationals.

In June 2022, ahead of the 2022–23 campaign, PSG flagship judoka Teddy Riner signed a two-year extension to his contract until 2024. Romane Dicko (2025), Marie-Ève Gahié (2024), Alpha Oumar Djalo (2024), Arnaud Aregba (2023), Faïza Mokdar (2024), and Luca Otmane (2024) all followed his footsteps in September. PSG also announced the contract extensions of five young judokas for an additional campaign. Mélanie Vieu, Martha Fawaz, Driss Masson-Jbilou, Eniel Caroly and Khamzat Saparbaev are now linked to the capital side until 2023. French judoka Alexis Mathieu joined the club that month as well, penning a two-season deal until 2024.

Defeated in the Champions League semifinals against future winners US Orléans Loiret JJ, the women's team led by 2022 World Champion Romane Dicko pulled themselves together to claim the bronze medal and thus third place on the podium. PSG's male side, however, finished seventh after losing to the gold and bronze medalists.

Grounds

CMG Dojo

PSG Judo president Djamel Bouras, star judoka Teddy Riner and representatives of PSG's other sporting sections came together to inaugurate the club's dojo in October 2018. PSG male footballers Kylian Mbappé, Layvin Kurzawa and Maxwell, PSG female footballers Laure Boulleau and Ashley Lawrence, PSG handballers Bruno Martini and Daniel Narcisse, and PSG esport players "DaXe" and "Ferra" were amongst those present in the inauguration ceremony.

The home of PSG's fifth sport section is located in a dedicated part of the CMG Sports Club One Italie complex in the 13th arrondissement of Paris. Decorated in club colors, the 180m² dojo at the Porte d'Italie houses the Paris Saint-Germain Judo School, launched in September 2018, as well as high level training facilities for Teddy Riner and the rest of professional judokas. The school is open to all age categories, from 4 years old to adults, and is managed by PSG Judo sporting director Nicolas Mossion.

Paris Saint-Germain Training Center

The Paris Saint-Germain Training Center, located in Poissy, Paris Region, will be PSG Judo's new training ground and sports complex. Owned and financed by parent club Paris Saint-Germain, the venue will bring together its male football, handball and judo teams as well as the football and handball academies. Each division will have its own dedicated facilities. Construction began in February 2020 and is expected to end in June 2023. The capital club will invest around €350m.

Honours

As of the 2022 French 1st Division Senior Championships.

 
  shared record

Judokas

As of 30 January 2023.

Seniors

Juniors

Personnel

As of 8 November 2021.

Management

Technical staff

References

External links

Official websites
PSG.FR - Site officiel du Paris Saint-Germain

Paris Saint-Germain F.C.
2017 establishments in France
Judo organizations
Judo in France